"Under My Skin" is a song by German singer Sarah Connor from her sixth studio album, Sexy as Hell (2008). Written by Remee, Thomas Troelsen, Connor, and O. G. Fortuna, and produced by Remee and Troelsen, the song was released as the album's lead single on 1 August 2008 in German-speaking Europe. Connor's first uptempo single release since 2005's "From Zero to Hero", the track managed to reach the top twenty in Austria and on a composite European Hot 100 Singles chart, as well as number four in Germany, where it became her highest-peaking single since her 2006 Christmas song "The Best Side of Life". 

The original version of the song, sung by Sarah Connor, received attention by the Korean label SM Entertainment. Like other songs SM Entertainments artists have covered, (“Hot Summer” - Monrose, “Run Devil Run” - Kesha, etc.) SM Entertainment wanted their artist TVXQ to release a Korean version of the same song. SM Entertainments artist TVXQ released the song as the lead single from their fourth studio album Mirotic and it went to number one in Japan.

Track listing
European CD maxi single
"Under My Skin" (T.S.O.B. Mix) – 3:17
"Under My Skin" (Delta Lab Mix) – 3:17
"Touch" – 4:10
"Under My Skin" (Club Remix) – 3:08
Enhanced Part with Photo-Gallery + Song Lyrics + Wallpaper

Charts

Weekly charts

Year-end charts

References

2008 singles
2008 songs
Sarah Connor (singer) songs
Songs written by Remee
Songs written by Sarah Connor (singer)
Songs written by Thomas Troelsen
X-Cell Records singles
Polydor Records singles